Henrik von Sydow (born 20 March 1976) is a Swedish politician of the Moderate Party, member of the Riksdag from 2002 to 2014.

References

Members of the Riksdag from the Moderate Party
Living people
1976 births
Members of the Riksdag 2002–2006